= Krasheninnikovy residential house =

Historical mansion in Moscow

- Жилой дом Крашенинниковых
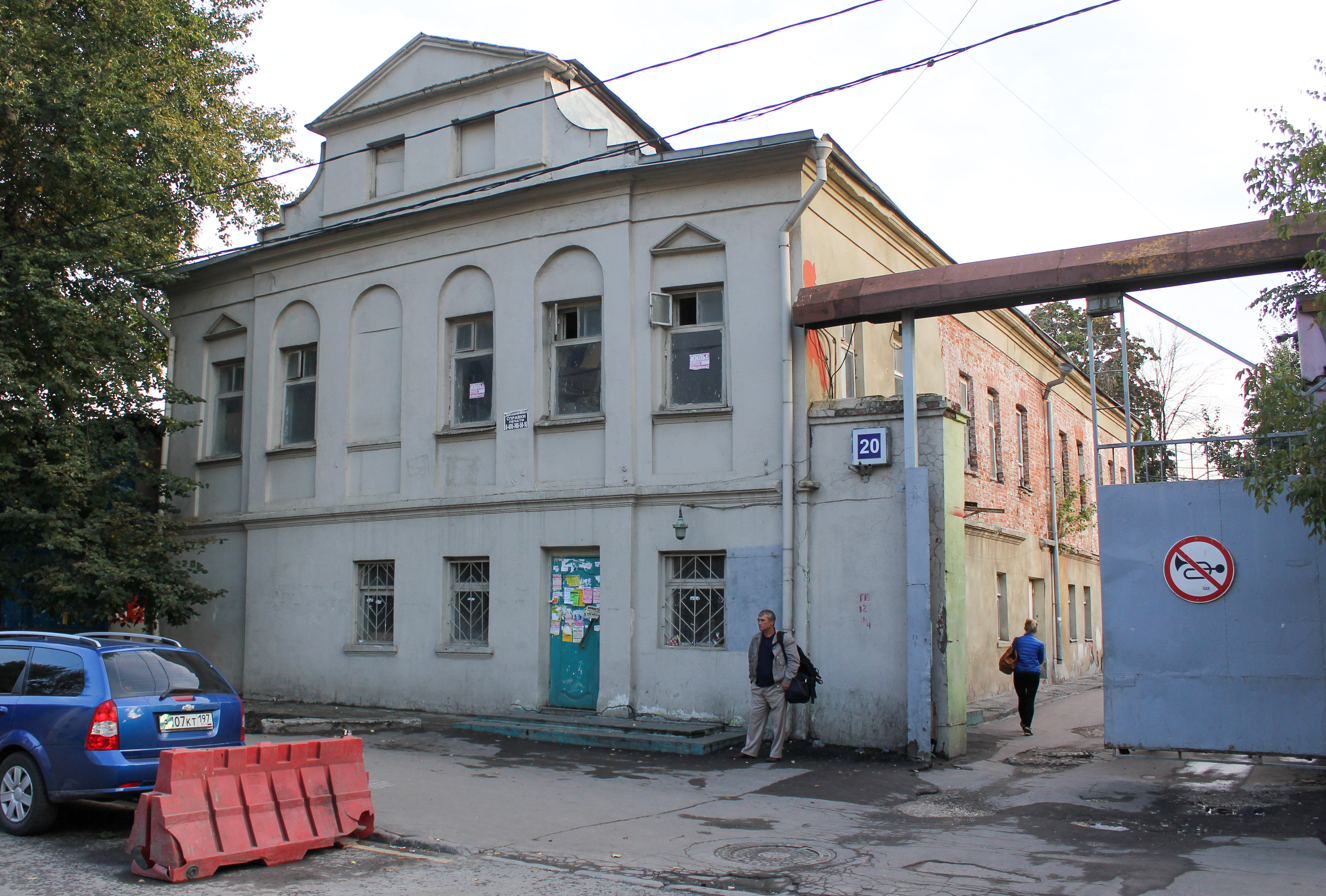
- 55°43′43″N 37°38′55″E
- Location: Moscow, Kozhevnicheskaya Street, house 20, building 19
- Beginning date: 1800
- Completion date: 1800

The Krasheninnikovy residential house (Russian: Жилой дом Крашенинниковых) is a historical mansion in Moscow, located at 20 Kozhevnicheskaya Street, building 19. It was built in 1800. The Krasheninnikovs' dwelling house has the status of an object of cultural heritage of regional significance.

== History ==
In 1800, Moscow merchants Krasheninnikovs applied for the construction of several houses on Kozhevnicheskaya Street, among which there was a stone two-story apartment house. During the fire of 1812, he seriously suffered, but five years later was restored. Since then, its facade has remained unchanged. The house has three floors, a basement and is a typical example of building a handicraft street in Moscow.

In the late 19th to early 20th century, the house belonged to the merchant of the first guild Nikolai Sergeevich Rasteryaev. In 1896, he made a two-story stone annex to the house from the yard. In the courtyard, he placed the construction of his tinning factory, where lead pipes were produced. According to the information of 1914, the building housed the factory office, the apartment of a master, a manager and employees. In the 1930s, the car repair enterprise "Aremkuz" of Glavmonstrans was opened in the former estate.

Due to the frequent change of owners and the appointment of the building, its original interiors are almost completely lost. The window and door aisles, the basement, the triangular sandricks above the windows of the second floor and the intercorrelated cornice have been preserved characteristic for the after-fire building.

In 2018 the house received the status of a cultural heritage site of regional significance.
